Sultan Mansur Shah ibni Almarhum Sultan Ahmad Shah I (died 1519) was the fourth Sultan of Pahang who reigned from 1495 to 1519. He succeeded on the abdication of his father, Ahmad Shah I in 1495, and reigned jointly with his cousin, Abdul Jamil Shah I. He only assumed full control after the death of the latter in 1512.

Personal life
Sultan Mansur was known as Raja Mansur before his accession. He was the only son of the second Sultan of Pahang, Ahmad Shah I by his wife, a daughter of Bendahara Tun Hamzah of Pahang. He had a sister from his father's other wife named Raja Wad or Raja Olah. 

From his marriage to an unknown lady, Sultan Mansur had issued two daughters, Raja Puspa Dewi and Raja Kesuma Dewi. Raja Puspa Dewi was married to Raja Ahmad bin Raja Muhammad, a Terengganuan prince from House of Melaka. She had issued a son from this marriage, named Raja Umar, the future Ali Jalla Abdul Jalil Shah II of Johor.

In 1511, following the fall of Melaka to the Portugal, Sultan Mahmud retreated to Pahang where he stayed a year. During his stay, he arranged a marriage between Sultan Mansur and his daughter Raja Dewi, whose mother was a Kelantanese princess.

Reign
Raja Mansur ascended to the throne at a very young age following the abdication of his father, Ahmad Shah I, who went into religious seclusion in 1495. As Pahang at that time was still a vassal of Melaka, Sultan Mahmud of Melaka had sent his minister Seri Dewa Raja to install his preferred new ruler. Raja Jamil was selected and was styled Abdul Jamil Shah I. It appears he reigned jointly with Sultan Mansur, and had exercised a greater authority over the young Sultan.

The reign of the two Sultans oversaw the restoration of ties between Pahang and Melaka, that previously marred with diplomatic tensions during the reign of Ahmad Shah. In 1500, the two states cooperated to defeat an invasion by the Nakhon Si Thammarat Kingdom on the instruction of Ramathibodi II of Ayutthaya. It was the last Thai's attempt to subjugate the southern Malay states.

Following the death of his joint ruler and cousin, Sultan Abdul Jamil, Sultan Mansur became the sole ruler and assumed full control in 1512. Earlier in 1511, the city of Melaka was conquered by the Portugal, bringing the rule of Melaka Sultanate to an end, and so the Pahang status as a vassal. However, the Portuguese still recognise Pahang as a vassal, on the pretext that the city is now under their control, and demanded tribute. Sultan Mansur refused to pay the annual tribute, which resulted in open warfare between Pahang and the Portuguese.

Death
Sultan Mansur died around 1519, slain by a group of Hulubalang, for committing adultery with one of the former wives of his father. The story was narrated in the Bustanus al-Salatin. According to the Malay Annals, his killing was on the instruction of his father, the former Sultan Ahmad, who was living in seclusion at Lubuk Pelang. Sultan Ahmad also died shortly afterwards and was buried at Lubuk Pelang.

References

Bibliography
 
 
 
 
 
 

1519 deaths
Sultans of Pahang
16th-century monarchs in Asia
16th-century murdered monarchs
Murder in 1519